The 2019 Magyar Kupa Final was the final match of the 2018–19 Magyar Kupa, played between Budapest Honvéd and Fehérvár on 25 May 2019 at the Groupama Arena in Budapest, Hungary.

Route to the final

Match

References

External links
 Official site 

2019
Budapest Honvéd FC matches
Fehérvár FC matches